The Edwin J. Nieman Sr. House is a historic house located at 13030 North Cedarburg Road in Mequon, Wisconsin. The house was added to the National Register of Historic Places on April 12, 1996.

Description and history 
Built in 1928, the house was designed by Herman Bruns in the Tudor Revival style. Designed to resemble a country house, the house includes a glass conservatory with a fountain, stained glass windows, and wrought iron fixtures. Edwin J. Nieman Sr., the home's owner, was a partner in the Fromm Bros.-Nieman Co., at the time the largest silver fox breeder in the nation; the home originally bordered one of the firm's fox farms on all sides. Nieman lived in the house until he died in 1985.

References

Houses on the National Register of Historic Places in Wisconsin
Tudor Revival architecture in Wisconsin
Houses completed in 1928
Houses in Ozaukee County, Wisconsin
National Register of Historic Places in Ozaukee County, Wisconsin